The Mercedes-Benz W211 is the third generation Mercedes-Benz E-Class made from 2002 to 2009 in sedan/saloon and station wagon/estate configurations – replacing the W210 E-Class models and superseded by the Mercedes-Benz W212 in 2009.

The C219, marketed as the CLS, was introduced as a niche model in 2005, based on W211 mechanicals.

Launched in 2002 for the 2003 model year, the W211 E-Class was another evolution of the previous model. Before North American sales began, the car was shown in the 2002 movie Men in Black II. The W211 development program began in 1997, followed by design work. The final designs were chosen in 1999, and German patents were filed on December 18, 2000 utilizing an E 500 prototype. Development ended in 2001 after 48 months, at a total cost of €2 billion. Pilot production went into testing in the summer of 2001, and the W211 E-Class debuted at the Brussels Motor Show in January 2002.

The W211 Platform was also the base foundation for which the newly re-introduced Chrysler LX cars were engineered from (Chrysler 300, Dodge Charger, Dodge Magnum).

2003–2006

at the 2002 European Motor Show Brussels featuring twin-headlights, angled slightly rearward. The 2003 E-Class was larger than its predecessors while offering less interior space, particularly in the estate version, than the W210 it replaced. It offered gasoline or diesel engines with a choice of rear or 4-wheel drive.

Mercedes-Benz claimed to have reduced the fuel consumption of the new E-Class by up to 0.9 litres per 100 km compared with the outgoing model. The redesigned 2003 model featured electrohydraulic braking system marketed as Sensotronic Brake Control (SBC), which was standard equipment in the E-Class. Options included multicontour front seats and dual control air suspension system marketed as Airmatic DC.

Air suspension was standard equipment in the top-of-the-range E 500 V8 model and was available as an option on all other E-Class models. The W211 is a more complex car than its predecessor, with a programmable serial bus and many automated systems.

The 2003 E-Class was offered in sedan and 5-door station wagon configurations in three trim lines, marketed as Classic, Elegance, and Avantgarde. The W211 was the first E-Class since 1985 equipped with two windshield wipers.

The transmission options were 5 or 7-speed automatic or 6-speed manual. V6, V8, inline-4, and supercharged inline-4 engines were offered. Engine outputs of E 240 and E 270 models from the previous W210 E-Class were given a 5 kW increase to 130 kW, while the E 500 uses the 225 kW 5.0-litre V8 from the W220 S-Class to supersede the W210 E 430. The E 320 remained unchanged, producing 165 kW of power.

E 320 CDI

E 400 CDI

E 55 AMG (2003–2006)


The second generation E 55 AMG debuted in September 2002 at the Paris Motor Show. It debuted as the fastest production sedan in the world. The E 55 AMG was also offered in an estate version for later model years.

E 55 Powertrain
The E 55 AMG is powered by the M113K engine, a 5.4 L V8 with a Lysholm type supercharger manufactured by IHI. The E 55's engine won International Performance Engine of the Year for 2003. The difference in power is due to a smaller-diameter, longer-length exhaust system in the E 55.

E 55 suspension, brakes, wheels & tires
E 55 came with an AMG tuned Airmatic suspension with 3 different driving modes as well as the ability to significantly raise the car. The E 55 features  cross drilled disc brakes at the front with 8 piston calipers. The rear brakes consist of  inch discs and 4 piston calipers. The E 55 came with 245/40/18 tires up front and 265/35/18 in the rear with performance tires on the standard AMG 18" split spoke wheels.

E 55 Performance
Car and Driver reported in their testing that the E 55 AMG was faster than the SL55 AMG. The E 55 AMG was the fastest four door car in Mercedes-Benz's lineup at the time, and easily outperformed its rivals. While the E 55 could accelerate from 0- in 9.8 seconds, it took the Audi RS6 11 seconds. The E 55 was the fastest production sedan available until Mercedes-Benz released the S65 AMG. However, Car and Driver criticized the brakes on the E 55, chastising them for being difficult to modulate, and said that the car as a whole felt 'aloof'.

Car and Driver also tested an E 55 AMG Wagon, which weighs  more than the sedan.

The E 55 was a sales success, being the best selling AMG until the release of the C 63 AMG.

2006–2009 (mid-generational refresh)

The W211 was updated in 2006 for the 2007 model year. There was new standard and optional equipment, which enabled the W211 to hold its own against its competitors. Sensotronic was dropped due to customer complaints about its software, while Pre-Safe (w/o autonomous braking) was made standard. The announced vehicle was unveiled at the 2006 New York International Auto Show. In total, 29 model variants were available, with 16 Saloons and 13 Estates. New standard equipment included PRE-SAFE active protection, NECK-PRO head restraints, flashing brake lights, tyre pressure monitor. The optional Intelligent Light System included bi-xenon headlamps and 5 different lighting functions. The bodies were restyled including the front grill, rear view mirror, side mirrors, redesigned headlamps, front spoiler, rear lights, gear knob and steering wheel.

Coinciding with the minor model update, the largest factory built engine in the E-class range, the E 500 (badged E 550 in some countries), had its engine size increased from 5 litres to 5.5 litres in 2006.

E 63 AMG (2007–2009)

The E 63 AMG was the refreshed high-performance model of the W211, replacing the E 55 AMG. Besides the Saloon, it was also offered in the Estate body style similarly to the E 55 AMG estate model to compete with the new wagon versions of the BMW M5 (E61) and Audi RS 6 (C6), though those two high-performance wagons were never sold in North America.

This engine had a high-pressure die-cast alloy cylinder block with twin-wire arc spray coated running surfaces. Compression ratio is 11.3:1. According to many auto journalists, the E 63 AMG was one of the quickest production sports sedans in the world. Both the sedan (saloon) and wagon had a 0– acceleration time of 4.3 seconds. Compared to the previous E 55 AMG, the E 63 AMG had more horsepower but less torque, enabling it to be mated to the newer 7G-Tronic automatic transmission.

While the E 500 and E 550 had the standard Mercedes Airmatic DC suspension with adaptive damping, the E 63 AMG had the AMG-tuned Airmatic suspension which with the stability control turned off gave it far better driving dynamics than its non-AMG predecessors.

The AMG Performance package P030 added electronic speed limiter deletion, limited-slip rear differential, Alcantara sports steering wheel, stiffer valving Airmatic suspension over the standard AMG tuned Airmatic, AMG  5-spoke multi-piece wheels, and optional AMG carbon fibre trim.

E-Guard (2006–2009)
The E-Guard was an armoured version with category B4 protection level. Engine choices included E 320 CDI, E 350, and E 500. The vehicles were reinforced with steel and aramid. Other safety equipment included Michelin MOExtended run-flat tyres with pressure loss warning system.

E 300 BlueTEC (2007–2009)
Common rail Direct Injection with a 7G-Tronic automatic transmission, launched in the US as the E 320 BlueTEC in 2007 and in Europe as the E 300 BlueTEC in 2008. The W211 never had a urea injection system throughout its production. The Bluetec name was only adopted to have consistency between the petrol and diesel nomenclature.

Mechanical

Engines
There was a wider range of engines available in Europe than North America and other markets.

 2006-2009 E 500 are known as the E 550 in US, Canada.
E 500 was sold with 5.0L in US, Canada for 2003–2006, and as the E 550 with 5.5L after 2007.
E 300 BlueTEC was sold as E 320 BlueTEC in US, Canada.
E 280 4MATIC was sold as E 300 4MATIC in Canada.
E 240 was sold as E 260 in Indonesia
Note that some models (i.e.: E 280, E 350, E 280 CDI) are introduced with the M272 and OM642 engines in pre-facelift form

Transmissions
Optional equipment:
5-Speed Automatic – code 42/3 in the data-card;
7-Speed Automatic (7G-TRONIC) – code

2/7 in the data-card;
Up to approx. 07/2005:

From 07/2005:

From 09/2005:

From 01/2006:

From 09/2007:

From 04/2008:
The same, except:

Safety

Sales
On 19 December 2008, Mercedes-Benz announced it had delivered 1.5 million units of W211 E-Class vehicles, with 1,270,000 sedans and 230,000 wagons.

US and Germany sales

References

External links
 E-Class press kits: Estate, Press Driving Presentation, Maastricht 2005 – Models and engines , E 420 CDI , V6 with 4MATIC
 E-Class press kits, 2nd generation: TecDay – Intelligent Light System , E-Class, E-Class Experience Paris-Beijing 2006, Mercedes-Benz at the "Auto China 2006" show in Beijing, New Mercedes-Benz E-Class models with environmentally friendly drive systems

W211
W211
Euro NCAP executive cars
Partial zero-emissions vehicles
Cars introduced in 2002
Cars discontinued in 2011
Limousines
Police vehicles